Former Team Saxo Bank staff are road bicycle racers and sporting directors previously employed by the professional cycling team of , previously known as Team CSC.

Former riders

Former stagiaire

Former sports directors

References

External links
Official Team CSC site 
Trap-Friis.dk (riders database)

riders
Team Tinkoff-Saxo